= Kim Fowler =

Electrical and systems engineer

Kim Fowler from the Kansas State University, Manhattan, KS was named Fellow of the Institute of Electrical and Electronics Engineers (IEEE) in 2014 for contributions to mission-critical and safety-critical systems engineering.
